Man of Many Faces or The Man with a Thousand Faces is an Iranian comedy television series created for the channel IRIB TV3. It was directed by Mehran Modiri, who also stars as the lead character Masoud Shastchi. It features much of the cast of Mozaffar's Garden, a series made earlier by Modiri. Man of Many Many Faces is sequel to this series.

13 episodes of the series aired on IRIB TV3 from 20 March to 2 April 2008. The complete collection of episodes was later released on home media in a box set of three DVD discs.

Cast
 Mehran Modiri as Masoud Shastchi
 Parviz Fallahipoor as Dr. Tabibian
 Ali Reza Khamseh as Ghazzaghemandian (Farhang)
 Pejman Bazeghi as Shahin Etemadi
 Shaghayegh Dehghan as shahin's wife
 Reza Feiz Noroozi as Mr Jandaghi
 Siamak Ansari as Dr Soheil Tabibian
 Rasoul Najafian as Maestro Kharab
 Akram Mohammadi as Ziba
 Parastoo Golestani as Soheila Tabibian
 Falamak Joneidi as Sahar Jandaghi
 Gholam Reza Nik-khah as Masoud's father
 Parvin Ghaem-maghami as Masoud's mother
 Saed Hedayati as Judge

See also
Man of Many Many Faces

References

External links
 
Man of Many Faces in IRIB TV3

Iranian television series
2000s Iranian television series
2008 Iranian television series debuts
2008 Iranian television series endings
Islamic Republic of Iran Broadcasting original programming
Persian-language television shows